CliftonLarsonAllen LLP (known as CliftonLarsonAllen or CLA) is a professional services network and the eighth-largest  accountancy firm in the United States. It was established in 2012 with the merger of two U.S. firms: Clifton Gunderson LLP (based in Milwaukee, Wisconsin) and LarsonAllen LLP (based in Minneapolis, Minnesota). It is a member of the Nexia International accounting network.

History 
Clifton Gunderson LLP was the 14th-largest accounting firm in the U.S. in 2010, and the largest member firm of HLB International until it left that network in 2012 after the merger with LarsonAllen. The merger occurred January 2, 2012. The decision to affiliate with Nexia rather than HLB International was taken after the merger. Kris McMasters and Gordy Viere became the first co-CEOs of CLA, with Viere also serving as the CEO of CLA Holdings. McMasters retired April 1, 2013, leaving Viere as sole CEO. Denny Schleper became the CEO of CLA in January 2015 after Viere retired.

In September 2013, CLA agreed to pay a $35,100,000 settlement on the audit of the City of Dixon, Illinois. Clifton Gunderson had performed the audit for many years, but Clifton Gunderson had failed to recognize fraud committed by the city's controller, Rita Crundwell, that amounted to nearly $54 million. In addition, the firm was fined by the Illinois Department of Financial and Professional Regulation.

References

External links
Official website

Accounting firms of the United States
Business services companies established in 1953
1953 establishments in Minnesota